The Zorn Badge (Sw: Zornmärket) is an award that is given to prominent folk musicians in Sweden. The prize is awarded by Svenska Folkdansringen, the Swedish national organization for traditional music, dance and handicraft.

History
In 1910, the first national gathering of spelmän (performers of traditional folk music) took place at Skansen in Stockholm. For this occasion, the artist Anders Zorn, who was interested in the revival of traditional folk culture, designed and financed a silver badge for distribution to all the participating spelmän. In the early 1930s, Svenska Folkdansringen received the rights to the badge from Zorn's widow Emma.  They put together a jury for a new National Folk Musicians' Gathering in Västerås in 1933, before whom spelmän could test their mettle.  The Jury would grant a number of different awards to those spelmän, the highest of which would be Anders Zorn's silver badge.

The award
The Zorn Badge has three levels: bronze, silver and gold. The bronze and silver badges are awarded after trials, which take place at regional folk musicians' gatherings where a jury from Svenska Folkdansringen is present. A musician who wishes to try for the Zorn Badge must be 16 years of age, and must perform three to five different pieces of folk music.

The gold badge is awarded to one or two master musicians each year. There are no trials for this level, which is awarded to extremely prominent musicians and tradition bearers.

A musician who receives the silver or gold badge is entitled to call himself or herself Riksspelman (often translated as Musician of the Realm or National Folk Musician).  Sweden today has approximately 300 living Riksspelmän.

Swedish folk music artists with Riksspelman status that have received golden Zorn Badge distinctions 

* Silver Badge awards to Granhammar in 1931 and Dahlgren in 1933 were done without a live performance and was decided by the board of directors at Ungdomsringen. Likewise, the silver distinction awarded to Iderström in 1942 followed the same procedure.

See also
Swedish folk music
Bellman Prize

References

External links
 Zornmärkesnämnden (the Zorn Badge committee in Svenska Folkdansringen)

Swedish folk music
Swedish music awards
Anders Zorn